Clara Cleymans (born 5 January 1989) is a Belgian actress and musical theatre singer.

She began her career in 1997 by appearing in the Belgian TV series Samson en Gert. She made her film debut in the 1999 movie De Kabouterschat. After appearing in various productions, she portrayed one of the main characters in the TV series Dag & Nacht: Hotel Eburon (2010). She had leading roles in various TV series such as Thuis (2010–2011), Tegen de sterren op (2010–2018), Code 37 (2011), De Ridder (2013–2016), and We moeten eens praten (2021). Besides her television works, she had leading roles in films such as Kill Me Please (2010), Groenten uit Balen (2011), and Yummy (2019).

Early years and education 
She was born on 5 January 1989 in Wilrijk, as the second child of Karin Jacobs and Jan Cleymans. She has an older brother, named Jelle. She attended the Lemmensinstituut in Leuven, and then the philosophy department of the University of Antwerp.

Career 
She began her acting career when she was 8 years old, and appeared as Klaartje in a 1997 episode of the Belgian television series Samson en Gert. Her film debut came in 1999 by appearing as Liese in De Kabouterschat. She had the same role in the following sequels as well, Plop in de Wolken (2000) and Plop en de Toverstaf (2003).

After having minor roles in various television series, she had her first leading role in the one-season VTM series Dag & Nacht: Hotel Eburon (2010) as Amber Claessens. Between 2010 and 2011, she portrayed Nina Oostvoghels, one of the main characters at that time of the Eén series Thuis. She imitated various celebrities and public figures, and had different characters in the VTM satirical series Tegen de sterren op between 2010 and 2018 . For her performances in the series, she was awarded with the Rising Star award in the Vlaamse Televisie Sterren 2011, and nominated for the Best Actress in the 2012 edition of the awards. Cleymans continued her film career with Kill Me Please (2010) and Groenten uit Balen (2011). She portrayed public prosecutor Helena De Ridder, the leading role of the four-season Eén series De Ridder (2013–2016). She was nominated for the Best Actress in the 2014 and 2015 editions of the Vlaamse Televisie Sterren, for the performances in De Ridder, and De Ridder and Tegen de sterren op respectively.

Between 2018 and 2019, she portrayed Sarah Liebman, a Jewish girl that has a love affair with a non-Jewish guy Louis Segers (Jonas Van Geel) in a dramatic musical theatre '40-'45 that sets during the World War II. In the Belgian comedy horror zombie movie Yummy (2019), she played the hospital director Janja, one of the leading roles in the movie. She appeared as Els and shared the main role with Rik Verheye in We moeten eens praten, the Eén mini-series that started to air in January 2021.

Personal life 
She married Jo Mahieu in 2014. The couple has two children, Jeanne (born 2016) and Romy (born 2019).

Filmography

Awards and nominations

References

External links 

 
 

1989 births
Living people
Belgian child actresses
Belgian film actresses
Belgian musical theatre actresses
Belgian stage actresses
Belgian television actresses
Belgian voice actresses
People from Wilrijk
University of Antwerp alumni
20th-century Belgian actresses
21st-century Belgian actresses